Sven Plex Petersson, registered as Per Sven Pettersson (7 August 1926 – 25 June 2011)) was a Swedish sports journalist, active for Sveriges Radio and Sveriges Television. He was employed by Sveriges Radio in 1957.

Career
Petersson was born on 7 August 1926 in Lit, Sweden, the son of Fritz Petersson, a manufacturer, and Carin (née Johansson). He worked for Östersunds-Posten from 1944 to 1956, and Sveriges Radio/TV from 1957. Petersson worked for the Swedish radio's sports editorial section from 1957 to 1959 and Sveriges Television's sports editorial section from 1959. Some memorable moments from his time as a commentator included Ingemar Stenmark's alpine career - and made Sweden stand still during the live broadcasts. He also commented on classic moments such as Bob Beamon's long jump of 8.90 in the 1968 Summer Olympics and Anders Gärderud's gold in the 3,000 meter hurdles in the 1976 Summer Olympics. Petersson was also known for commenting on the ski jumping from Garmisch-Partenkirchen every New Year's day.

Personal life
In 1956, Petersson married Marianne Arnesson (born 1927), the daughter of Albin Arnesson and Märta (née Pålsson). They had three children; Per (born 1957), Karin (born 1959) and Ulf (born 1961).

Bibliography

Footnotes

References

1926 births
2011 deaths
Swedish sports broadcasters
20th-century Swedish journalists
People from Östersund Municipality